Severo Cagatan Caermare (born October 22, 1969) is a Filipino prelate of the Roman Catholic Church. He is the Bishop of the Diocese of Dipolog in the Philippines.

Background

Caermare was born on October 22, 1969 in Sibutad, Zamboanga del Norte, Philippines. He  attended Cor Jesu Seminary in Dipolog, Zamboanga del Norte, Philippines and St. John Vianney Theological Seminary in Cagayan de Oro. He attained his degree in theology from Cor Jesu Seminary in Dipolog, Philippines.

Ministry

Sacerdotal
Caermare was ordained as priest on April 22, 1996 at Saint Anne Parish in his hometown of Sibutad, Zamboanga del Norte. As priest, Caermare spent most of his pastoral work in parishes. He also lectured in seminaries.

Episcopal
Pope Francis appointed Caermare to be the 3rd Bishop of the Diocese of Dipolog on July 25, 2014, and was ordained on October 30, 2014 in the Cathedral of Our Lady of the Most Holy Rosary in Dipolog with Apostolic Nuncio to the Philippines Giuseppe Pinto as the Principal Consecrator, Bishop Jose Cabantan of Diocese of Malaybalay and Bishop Emeritus Jose Manguiran of Dipolog as Principal Co-Consecrators. Because of this, Caermare became the first bishop from the Diocese of Dipolog where he was ordained.

On December 6, 2017, after the passing of Iligan bishop Elenito Galido, Pope Francis appointed Caermare as Apostolic Administrator for the Diocese of Iligan until September 5, 2019, after the appointment of Bishop Jose Rapadas III.

References

21st-century Roman Catholic bishops in the Philippines
1969 births
People from Zamboanga del Norte
Living people